Together Again is the eighth studio album by country music artists George Jones and Tammy Wynette, released in 1980 on the Epic Records label. It was their first album since their 1976 hit album Golden Ring; their next album would not come until 1995 with One.

Background
Jones and Wynette had divorced in 1975 but they had enjoyed their biggest chart success from that point on, with their 1976 LP Golden Ring hitting number one and spawning two chart topping singles, "Golden Ring" and "Near You".  In 1977 they had another top five hit with "Southern California".  Their periodic appearances together only fueled speculation among their fans that they might get back together romantically, although this cooled somewhat when Wynette married songwriter George Richey in 1978 and Jones spiraled into an abyss of alcohol and drugs, often disappearing for weeks on end.  The couple could still be civil, however, with Wynette contributing to Jones 1979 duet album My Very Special Guests, and some kind of album seemed likely.  In September, Together Again was released and produced the hit single "Two Story House", which peaked at number 2 on the charts.  The song details how a poor married couple finally obtain all the riches they had dreamed of only to find that their love has died.  The duo's harmonies were as shimmering as ever but the LP only reached number 26 on the Billboard country album charts.  A second single, "A Pair of Old Sneakers", barely cracked the top twenty.  One song, "Love in the Meantime", sounded more like a solo spot for Tammy than a duet, with George only singing harmony on the choruses.  Producer Billy Sherrill gave an extremely contemporary edge (for the time) to several of the songs, especially the album's closing track "Night Spell".  "We'll Talk About It Later" was written by Wynette, who also had a hand in writing "Two Story House".  

In the 2019 Ken Burns documentary Country Music, Sherrill, recalling this period, compared Jones and Wynette to "two wounded animals."

Reception

While "Two Story House" was riding high on the charts, Jones and Wynette made a disastrous appearance on The Tonight Show to promote it.  In his book George Jones: The Life and Times of a Honky Tonk Legend, Bob Allen recounts the episode:  "George showed up with an ill-suited "uptown" hairdo that had been slapped on him at the last minute by an image consultant, and which made him look like something off the set of Night of the Living Dead...Before the two of them were even halfway through the song, George stopped suddenly, without warning, and confessed sheepishly to the vast live TV audience that he'd forgotten the words.  The cameras panned briskly away.  The programmers broke for a dog-food commercial, and the Possum was seen no more that night."

Jones himself hated having to work with Wynette so soon after their marriage had failed. "That wasn't my idea," Jones later insisted in his 1996 autobiography. "In fact, I hated to work with her. It brought back too many unpleasant memories, and when some fans saw us together, they got it in their heads that we were going to get back together romantically." It would be over a decade more before Jones was comfortable around Wynette again.

AllMusic's Stephen Thomas Erlewine retrospectively concedes that Together Again "doesn't have the spark of some of their earlier duets" but both of the singers "sound terrific...Even when the material isn't up to their talents, the duo sounds recharged, which makes Together Again a thoroughly enjoyable, if inconsistent, listen."

Track listing

External links
George Jones' Official Website
Tammy Wynette's Official Site
Record Label

1980 albums
George Jones albums
Tammy Wynette albums
Albums produced by Billy Sherrill
Epic Records albums
Vocal duet albums